Chanel Preston is an American pornographic actress. She entered the adult film industry in 2010. She was the Penthouse magazine Penthouse Pet for March 2012.

Early life
Preston was born and raised in Alaska. She is of English, German, and Spanish descent. At age 19 she moved to Hawaii, where she lived for six years. She worked as a stripper for over a year before working in porn. She is also a licensed aesthetician.

Preston entered the adult entertainment industry in January 2010, shooting her first scene with Nick Manning for Vivid Entertainment's Brand New Faces series. Preston has served as president of the Adult Performer Advocacy Committee.

Appearances
In February 2012, Chanel Preston was announced by Penthouse magazine to be their Penthouse Pet for March 2012. In September 2012, Preston appeared in the Russ Irwin music video "Get Me Home".

Preston co-hosted the 31st annual AVN Awards show alongside Samantha Saint on January 18, 2014. Also in 2014, Preston was on CNBC's list of "The Dirty Dozen: Porn's Most Popular Stars". In 2015 she appeared in the "Bust" music video by rapper Waka Flocka Flame.

Also in January 2014, she was featured alongside Dana DeArmond, Asa Akira, and Jessie Andrews in a Cosmopolitan article titled "4 Porn Stars on How They Stay Fit". The article was inspired by actress Gabrielle Union's comment made on Conan O'Brien's talk show about striving to follow the fitness routines of the porn stars she saw at her gym. She has also appeared as an extra on Sons of Anarchy.

Other ventures
In March 2014, Preston launched a sex education based web series titled Naked With Chanel. According to Cosmopolitan, the series "examines how our society and upbringing influences our ideas about sex." In order to fund the series, Preston used the fundraising website IndieGogo. Her 2013 campaign generated enough to build the series' website and to film several episodes. She also hosts a sex-positive podcast named "SexThink" with talk show host and political critic, Rob Nelson.

Awards
 2010 NightMoves Award - Best New Starlet (Editor's Choice)
 2011 NightMoves Award - Female Performer of the Year (Editor's Choice)
 2011 XBIZ Award - New Starlet of the Year
 2011 XRCO Award - Best New Starlet (tied with Allie Haze)
 2012 NightMoves Award - Best Overall Body (Editor's Choice)
 2013 NightMoves Award - Female Performer of the Year (Fan's Choice)
 2013 XBIZ Award - Best Scene (Gonzo/Non-Feature Release) - Nacho Invades America 2 (with Nacho Vidal)
 2013 Sex Award - Hottest Sex Scene - Evil Anal 16 (with Phoenix Marie & Manuel Ferrara)
 2014 AVN Award - Most Outrageous Sex Scene - Get My Belt (with Ryan Madison)
 2015 Free Speech Coalition Award - Performer of the Year

References

External links

 
 
 
 
 "I'm a Porn Star, and I Believe in God"

Year of birth missing (living people)
American female erotic dancers
American people of English descent
American people of German descent
American people of Spanish descent
American pornographic film actresses
Living people
Penthouse Pets
Pornographic film actors from Alaska
Pornographic film actors from Hawaii
21st-century American women